Inventology: How We Dream Up Things That Change the World is a 2016 book by Pagan Kennedy, in which the author details the processes by which people come up with innovative ideas.

In a starred review, Kirkus Reviews called it "[a] delightful account".

References

2016 non-fiction books
American non-fiction books